Oliver L. Byerly (April 20, 1840 – January 6, 1929) was an American politician in the state of Washington. He served in the Washington House of Representatives.

References

Republican Party members of the Washington House of Representatives
1840 births
1929 deaths
People from Westmoreland County, Pennsylvania
People from Longview, Washington